The Domestic Policy Council (DPC) is the principal forum used by the president of the United States for the consideration of domestic policy matters and senior policymaking, and includes Cabinet members and White House officials. The Council is part of the Office of Policy Development, which itself is within the Executive Office of the President of the United States.

Since the establishment of the Council in 1993, under the administration of President Bill Clinton, its purpose is to coordinate the domestic policy-making process; to coordinate domestic policy advice to the President; to ensure that domestic policy decisions and programs are consistent with the President’s stated goals, and to ensure that those goals are being effectively pursued; and to monitor implementation of the President’s domestic policy agenda.

The Domestic Policy Council differs from the National Economic Council, which is used to consider economic policy for the President. The Domestic Policy Council focuses on issues of domestic policy, which exclude economic policy matters. The Council is also the principal arm of the president when coordinating domestic policy measures throughout the executive branch.

The Domestic Policy Council is headed by the assistant to the president for domestic policy and director of the Domestic Policy Council. Since January 20, 2021, that position has been held by Susan Rice.

History and mission
The Domestic Policy Council was established on August 16, 1993 by Executive Order 12859, under President Clinton. The first director of the Domestic Policy Council was Carol Rasco, who was appointed by Clinton in 1993. The Council oversees development and implementation of the President’s domestic policy agenda and ensures coordination and communication among the heads of relevant Federal offices and agencies.

Prior to the creation of the National Economic Council, economic policy staff had existed since the 1960's. President Lyndon Johnson assigned a senior aide to develop and organize domestic policy, of which economic policy was included. In 1970, President Richard Nixon issued an executive order which created the Office of Policy Development. President Clinton split the responsibilities of the Domestic Policy Council with the National Economic Council.

The Council is composed of various Cabinet officials, who advise the president on domestic policy issues and matters.

Assistants to the President for Domestic Policy

References

External links
 White House: Domestic Policy Council

Economy of the United States
Domestic Policy Council
United States domestic policy
United States national commissions
1985 establishments in the United States